The Sydney Business Chamber was established in 1825 as the Sydney Chamber of Commerce  and is the second oldest business entity in New South Wales. Today it is a division of the NSW Business Chamber.

The Chamber's mission is to represent leading corporations across Greater Sydney and advocating for public policies that enhance Sydney as a competitive, collaborative and livable global city.

Membership of the Sydney Business Chamber is drawn from the city's corporate business community, covering all industry sectors. Representing leading corporations across Greater Sydney, the Sydney Business Chamber's mission is to ensure a competitive and livable global city through collaboration with government or by advocacy to government. With offices in the CBD and Parramatta, it provides a voice for the business community and advocates on a wide range of issues.

The Sydney Business Chamber is a leading advocate for Sydney as a competitive and livable global city with policies focused on: reforming Sydney's local governance; urban renewal and planning reform; recycling state assets to fund new transport and infrastructure projects; and supporting the evolution of Sydney as a leading service economy with a strong reputation in the arts, tourism and for international education. Headed by Katherine O'Regan as executive director, the Sydney Business Chamber is a key player in shaping government policy and has worked hard to enhance Sydney as a city that attracts global investment and global talent.

The Sydney Business Chamber developed Sydney: Connected, Productive, Livable to identify priorities and actions needed to lift Sydney's international status as a global destination for business and leisure and position Western Sydney as a new economic powerhouse with a strong focus on the benefits the Western Sydney Airport will bring to the Sydney economy and reshape Western Sydney as a place to live, work, study, visit and play.

Since 2012, The Chamber's efforts in Western Sydney, under the leadership of David Borger have focused on advocating ideas to grow economic opportunities across the region to provide a stimulus for existing businesses and to attract new businesses. Central to its advocacy was its successful campaign for the Badgerys Creek site to be named by the Federal Government with support from the Opposition and NSW Governments as the site of Sydney's second airport.

Chamber members also have access to high level networking events where they can discuss key issues and meet potential clients, suppliers, partners and competitors.

The Sydney Business Chamber is a partner of Business Events Sydney.

See also
 Economy of Sydney
 Economy of New South Wales

References

Chambers of commerce in Australia
Organizations established in 1825
Economy of Sydney